The 2010–11 Morelia season was the 64th professional season of Mexico's top-flight football league. The season is split into 2 tournaments—the Torneo Apertura and the Torneo Clausura—each with identical formats and each contested by the same eighteen teams. Morelia began their season on July 25, 2010 defeating Atlas 1–0, Morelia played their homes games on Sundays at noon local time.

Torneo Apertura

Squad 
As of June 14, 2010.

Regular season

North American SuperLiga

Group stage

Semi-final

Final

Goalscorers

Transfers

In

Out

Results

Results summary

Results by round

Torneo Clausura

Current squad

Regular season

Final phase 

Morelia won 5–3 on aggregate

Morelia won 3–2 on aggregate

Goalscorers

Results

Results summary

Results by round

References 

2010–11 Primera División de México season
Mexican football clubs 2010–11 season